Roger Leedham Brown (born 9 August 1959) is a former Australian first-class cricketer, who until the arrival of Jason Gillespie, had played more first-class matches than any other Aboriginal Australian.

Born in Launceston, Tasmania, Brown played for Tasmania between 1984 and 1987, and represented Young Australia in Zimbabwe in 1985 and the Australian Prime Minister's XI against England in 1986–87. Brown was also a leading soccer player in Tasmania, representing Launceston Juventus.

See also
 List of Tasmanian representative cricketers

Sources
 Tatz, C. & Tatz, P. (2000) Black Gold, Aboriginal Studies Press: Canberra. .

References

Living people
1959 births
Australian cricketers
Tasmania cricketers
Indigenous Australian cricketers
Cricketers from Launceston, Tasmania